Gina Hart is a British comics artist best known for her colouring work on the Rupert Bear strips.  Unusually for a creator on this venerable strip, Hart enjoys close links with the fan community.

She has also worked for 2000 AD, colouring strips by artists such as John Ridgway and Simon Coleby. She has also worked on the Rogue Trooper strip and on Marvel UK titles like Transformers.

Notes

References

Gina Hart at 2000 AD online

British female comics artists
Comics colorists
Living people
Female comics writers
Year of birth missing (living people)